Hanson Spur is a flat-topped ridge,  long, trending northwest from Mount Falla, in the Queen Alexandra Range of Antarctica. It was named by the Advisory Committee on Antarctic Names in 1995 after Richard E. Hanson, an Ohio State University geologist who conducted field research in this area, 1990–91.

References

Ridges of the Ross Dependency
Shackleton Coast